Pterostylis thulia is a plant in the orchid family Orchidaceae and is endemic to Queensland. It was first formally described in 2010 by David Jones and given the name Oligochaetochilus thulius. The description was published in the journal The Orchadian from a specimen found near Blencoe Falls. In the same year, Jasmine Janes and Marco Duretto changed the name to Pterostylis thulia. The specific epithet (thulia) is derived from the Ancient Greek word Thoule meaning "farthest north".

References

thulia
Orchids of New South Wales
Taxa named by Marco Duretto
Plants described in 2010
Taxa named by David L. Jones (botanist)